The Burke School District is a public school district in Gregory County, based in Burke, South Dakota.

Schools
The Burke School District has one elementary school, one middle school, and one high school.

Elementary school
Burke Elementary School

Middle school
Burke Middle School

High school
Burke High School

References

External links

School districts in South Dakota